Mercury(I) fluoride or mercurous fluoride is the chemical compound composed of mercury and fluorine with the formula Hg2F2. It consists of small yellow cubic crystals, which turn black when exposed to light.

Synthesis
Mercury(I) fluoride is prepared by the reaction of mercury(I) carbonate with hydrofluoric acid:
Hg2CO3 + 2 HF → Hg2F2 + CO2 + H2O

Reactions
When added to water, mercury(I) fluoride hydrolyzes to elemental liquid mercury, mercury(II) oxide, and hydrofluoric acid:
Hg2F2 + H2O → Hg + HgO + 2 HF

It can be used in the Swarts reaction to convert alkyl halides into alkyl fluorides:
2 R-X + Hg2F2 → 2 R-F + Hg2X2
where X = Cl, Br, I

Structure

In common with other Hg(I) (mercurous) compounds which contain linear X-Hg-Hg-X units, Hg2F2 contains linear FHg2F units with an Hg-Hg bond length of 251 pm (Hg-Hg in the metal is 300 pm) and an Hg-F bond length of 214 pm.  The overall coordination of each Hg atom is a distorted octahedron; in addition to the bonded F and other Hg of the molecule, there are four other F atoms at 272 pm. The compound is often formulated as Hg22+ 2F−.

References

Mercury(I) compounds
Fluorides
Metal halides